Babita Pohoomull (born 1981) is a British actress. She played Preeti Choraria in EastEnders from 27 October 2006 to 3 January 2008. She also played Gita Dhatri in Casualty. As of September 2009, Pohoomull also appears in CBBC's Planet Ajay.

After leaving Eastenders she toured the UK in 2010 playing the lead role in the stage play, Hitting Home.

References

External links

British television actresses
British soap opera actresses
Living people
British people of Indian descent
1981 births
Alumni of the University of York
Place of birth missing (living people)